Masoo Sahar ( Mehar) is a village in Sindh, Pakistan.

The village was established in 1721. According to a 2018 survey, its population was at least 3,122. A primary school for boys was established in 1940, and one for girls in 1987 and also a sindh public primary school.

Reference 
Related villages:kando sahar (ڪنڊو ساهڙ) Khan m.gopang (خان محمدگوپانگ) Dodo jogi (دودوجوگي)

Locality
Here is living only (saharساهڙ) (village maso sahar) is in [Mehar town] in [Dadu District]. It is administrated by the Government of Sindh. He is divided in Union Council shah panjo sultan.

History 
during British rule with the town of Mehar as the headquarters. The taluka, along with the rest of Sindh, was for a time was part of the Bombay Presidency of British India.

The Imperial Gazetteer of India, written over a century ago during British rule, describes the taluka as follows

Education 
Govt.primary school boys (1940)  
Govt.primary school girls(1987) Sindh public school masso sahar

Populated places in Sindh